Frits Toxwerdt von Bülow (April 16, 1872 in Aalborg – July 30, 1955 in Copenhagen) was a Danish politician and government minister.

Frits Bülow was the son of Marie f. Toxwerdt and E.C. Bülow, town clerk and member of the noble family of Bülow. He graduated in 1894 and obtained a position working in a law office. In 1898, he graduated in law. In 1903 at the early age of 30, he was granted the right to plead cases before the Danish Supreme Court.

He was a business lawyer and member of the Højre party, but made contact with members of the Venstre party while defending J.C. Christensen and Sigurd Berg against impeachment charges in the Alberti scandal. As result of these connections he was made Justice Minister in the government of Klaus Berntsen (1910–1913).

He was a member of the Landstinget from 1920 to 1924 and its speaker until 1922. From 1916 to 1922 he served as legal adviser to the Landmandsbanken and also served on the board of Nationalbanken, first as a member and later as chairman. He had to resign as speaker of the Landstinget as a result of the bank's collapse in 1922.

On March 28, 1899, Bülow married Fanny Augusta Frederikke f. Poulsen, daughter of Jonas Poulsen and Rebekka f. Brandt. He is the grandfather of Claus von Bülow.

Danish Justice Ministers
Members of the Landsting (Denmark)
Speakers of the Landsting (Denmark)
20th-century Danish lawyers
Politicians from Aalborg
Fritz
1872 births
1955 deaths